The Easter Riots is the name given to a period of unrest in Uppsala, Sweden, during the Easter of 1943. The National Socialist group Swedish Socialist Union  (SSS, previously the National Socialist Workers' Party) held its national congress in Uppsala, amid the Second World War and only days after events like the Warsaw Ghetto Uprising. The unrest climaxed on 26 April, when the SSS – who after initially belonging to a Strasserist wing of National Socialism began adopting a more indigenous form of fascism in 1938, and included Ingvar Kamprad among its early members – ended the congress by holding a demonstration at the Royal Mounds of Old Uppsala.

Thousands of anti-fascists gathered to protest against the Nazi gathering at the Royal Mounds, a historical site that held much political symbolism among Swedish nationalists. Policemen had been called in from Stockholm to defend the demonstration, and after the situation became increasingly tense they resorted to violence, dispersing the peacefully protesting crowds and onlookers alike with heavy force.

In addition to writing a book about it, the historian and playwright Magnus Alkarp has depicted the riots in a play, 4 dagar i april. The play, produced by the Uppsala City Theatre and directed by Sara Cronberg, was put on in 2012. Alkarp received death threats from the Swedish Resistance Movement, a militant neo-Nazi group, after the play's premier.

See also
Nazism in Sweden

References

History of Uppsala
Nazism in Sweden
Riots and civil disorder in Sweden
1943 riots
1943 in Sweden
April 1943 events